Violeta Manushi (6 March 1926 – 26 July 2007) was an Albanian actress. She was honored with the People's Artist of Albania.  She is best known in Albania for her portrayal of Teto Ollga (Auntie Ollga), a symbolic character which followed her for much of her career. 

Born in Moscopole, Manushi studied at the Qemal Stafa High School, in Tirana, Albania.

Manushi never married or had any children. She died aged 81 at her home in Tirana, following a brief illness.

Filmography 
Trishtimi i zonjës Shnajder (2008)  (released posthumously)
Eja! (1987) 
Rrethimi i vogël (1986) 
Pallati 176 (1985)
Taulanti kërkon një motër (1984) 
Një vonesë e vogël (1983)
Përtej mureve të gurta (1981) 
Një shoqe nga fshati (1980) 
Zemrat që nuk plaken (1977) 
Zonja nga qyteti (1976)
Gjenerali i ushtrisë së vdekur (1975)
Mimoza llastica (1973)
Gjurma (1970) 
Plagë të vjetra (1969)
Përse bie kjo daulle (1969)
Vitet e para (1965) 
Debatik (1961) 
Tana (1958)

Theatrical plays 
Titanic Waltz
Qypi me flori
Epopeja e Ballit Kombëtar
Dom Gjoni
Pas vdekjes
Halili dhe Hajria
Tartufi
Mikroborgjezët
Rrënjët e thella
Orët e Kremlinit
Gjenerali i ushtrisë së vdekur
Morali i zonjës Dulska
Arturo Ui
Lumi i vdekur
Karnavalet e Korçës
Zonja nga qyteti
14 vjeç dhëndër
Epoka para gjyqit
Borgjezi fisnik
Fytyra e dytë
Pallati 176
Kati i gjashtë

References

1926 births
2007 deaths
Albanian actresses
Albanian film actresses
Albanian stage actresses
People's Artists of Albania
People from Moscopole
Qemal Stafa High School alumni
20th-century Albanian actresses